Raquel Peña Rodríguez (born 20 December 1988), also known as Pisco, is a Spanish footballer who plays as a defender for Atlético Madrid in the Spanish First Division.

In September 2009, she became the second Canarian female footballer to play for the Spain national team, making her debut in the 2011 World Cup qualifying against Malta.

References

1988 births
Living people
Spanish women's footballers
Spain women's international footballers
Atlético Madrid Femenino players
Primera División (women) players
UD Granadilla Tenerife players
Women's association football defenders
21st-century Spanish women